Tuggeranong Arts Centre is a purpose-built centre located on the shores of Lake Tuggeranong, in the town centre of Tuggeranong, a southern suburb of Canberra, Australian Capital Territory.  It is an organisation providing a wide range of arts activities for community participation, development and enjoyment.  The building features a 110-seat theatre/cinema, 2 galleries, 2 dance studios, a workshop space, and a digital media studio.

Tuggeranong Arts Centre is managed by Tuggeranong Community Arts Association Inc. and presents a diverse program of theatre, film, exhibitions, music, and dance to the public, combining community and professional arts.  A number of artists and community arts organisations hire the Centre's venues, including Canberra Dramatics, Free Rain Theatre, and Pied Piper Productions.

References

External links
 Tuggeranong Arts Centre - official site

Arts centres in Australia
Performing arts centres in Australia
Buildings and structures in Canberra
Arts organisations based in Australia
Tourist attractions in Canberra